Mayantoc, officially the Municipality of Mayantoc, is a 3rd class municipality in the province of Tarlac, Philippines. According to the 2020 census, it has a population of 32,597 people.

It is nestled in the foothills of the Zambales Mountains where the Camiling River originates and provides many scenic picnic and swimming sites, making it known as the summer capital of the province. The most common road to Mayantoc starts at "Crossing Mayantoc", at the national highway to Camiling, Tarlac just after the then Tarlac College of Agriculture (now the Tarlac Agricultural University) campus.

Etymology
The town got its name after a palm called 'yantoc' due to its abundance in the place.

History
The first settlers of Mayantoc before the coming of Christian migrants were the negritos of the Abiling tribe. As they arrived in great numbers, so the natives were soon forced to move deeper into the forest areas of the Zambales mountain range.

The Christian settlers, mostly came from the Ilocos region, notably the towns of Cabugao, Tagudin, Sarrat, Paoay, Sinait and Bacarra settled in villages in the southern portion of the thriving town of Camiling, acknowledged as the mother town of Mayantoc. These villages later formed the barangay of Mayantoc under the township of Camiling. The place was still a forested area where rattan was abundant, a palm known by visitor traders as "Yantoc", so that in time the barangay became known as Na Maraming Yantoc – the place of yantoc – later just Ma-Yantoc. As the barangay progressed and grew in the size and population, its inhabitants retained "Mayantoc" as its official name.

In an effort to convert the barangay of Mayantoc into a town, a petition signed by the inhabitants was sent to the proper authorities on 23 December 1916, with title deeds of several parcels of lands attached for the proposed school, market, plaza and town hall sites.

There were many others who helped in the birth of the new town, including Governor Gardner and Representative Luis Morales. Don Sergio Osmena, the speaker of House of Representative also helped in the granting of the people's petition. Then the American Governor General Francisco Burton Harrison promulgated Executive Order No. 96 declaring Mayantoc a separate town from Camiling and the new town was inaugurated on 17 January 1917. Don Manuel de Leon, then Governor of Tarlac province appointed Castillan Antonio Sanz, as the town first Municipal President. However Sanz was autocratic in Spanish customs and was in office for only six months, before a petition seeking his ousting, signed by several municipal councilors.

When the provincial board of Tarlac received the petition, Antonio Sanz was unseated, to be succeeded by the Vice President, Don Francisco Pascual Santos. That same year, an election was held in which Don Francisco P. Santos became the first elected Municipal President of Mayantoc.

The question of leadership having been popularly decided, the townspeople then took up the task of building the physical facilities of the community. The problem of a presentable Presidencia came up. But the municipal government was very poor. Bridges and roads were urgently needed. Canals along the roads of the town, especially around the plaza, needed digging. There were plenty of problems but few resources. The principal resource was the people themselves, imbued with pioneering spirit, cooperative and loyal to the leadership. The people donated whatever material they could afford, and freely gave their time and labor on the different projects of the new town.

Geography

Barangays
Mayantoc is administratively divided into 24 barangays:

Climate

Demographics

Economy

Points of interest
Saint Joseph Parish Church of Mayantoc (F-1842): Feast day, March 19; Parish Priest: Father Hipolito Pardinian; Vicariate of St. Michael the Archangel, Vicar Forane: Father Fred Dizon   under the Roman Catholic Diocese of Tarlac.
 ASEAN-New Zealand (ANZAP) Twin Falls, Barangay Bigbiga
 Kiti Calao Waterfalls, Barangay San Jose
 Calao Ecological Park, Barangay San Jose
 Nambalan Trails Jump Off (Nambalan Saweng), Barangay Nambalan
 Istaka, Barangay Gossood
 Garma's Farms, Barangay Gossood
 Hidden Paradise, Barangay Mapandan
 Labney Water Camps, Barangay Labney

Gallery

References

External links

Mayantoc Profile at PhilAtlas.com
[ Philippine Standard Geographic Code]

Municipalities of Tarlac